Hydrangea arborescens, commonly known as smooth hydrangea, wild hydrangea,  sevenbark, or in some cases, sheep flower,  is a species of flowering plant in the family Hydrangeaceae.

Description
Showy, sterile flowers are usually absent or if present they are usually less than 1 cm in diameter on the edge of the panicles. Flowering occurs May to July. Fruit is a ribbed, brown capsule about 2 mm long. Many are produced in October and persist through the winter.

The leaves are large (8 to 18 cm long), opposite, serrated, ovate, and deciduous.  The lower leaf surface is glabrous or with inconspicuous fine hairs, appearing green; trichomes of the lower surface are restricted to the midrib and major veins.

The stem bark has a peculiar tendency to peel off in several successive thin layers with different colors, hence the common name "sevenbark".

Smooth hydrangea can spread rapidly by stolons to form colonies.

Taxonomy
At one time both ashy hydrangea (Hydrangea cinerea) and silverleaf hydrangea (Hydrangea radiata) were considered subspecies of smooth hydrangea.  However, most taxonomists now consider them to be separate species.

Distribution and habitat
Smooth hydrangea is widely distributed across the eastern United States—from southern New York to the panhandle of Florida, west to eastern Oklahoma and southeastern Kansas.  It is mainly found in moist soils under a hardwood forest canopy and is often common along woodland road banks and streams.  It is common in the Delaware River Valley and in the Appalachian Mountains.

It is a host plant of the hydrangea sphinx moth.

Uses
This attractive native shrub is often cultivated for ornamental use.  In the UK the cultivar 'Annabelle' has gained the Royal Horticultural Society's Award of Garden Merit. The cultivar 'Grandiflora' has flowers that resemble snowballs, similar to Viburnum plicatum.
 
Smooth hydrangea root was used medicinally by Native Americans, and later, by early settlers for treatment of kidney and bladder stones.

It additionally has been marked as a pollinator plant, supporting and attracting bees and butterflies.

Gallery

References

External links

Cook, Will. Trees, shrubs, and woody vines of North Carolina. Wild Hydrangea (Hydrangea arborescens).
Information on cultivar Annabelle
Hydrangea arborescens Large-format diagnostic photos and information
Hydrangea Thoughts I - Informative but non-scholarly essay on Hydrangea (Culture, History and Etymology).
Briartech.com: Smooth Hydrangea, Hydrangea arborescens.

arborescens
Flora of the Northeastern United States
Flora of the Southeastern United States
Flora of the United States
Flora of Alabama
Natural history of the Great Smoky Mountains
Plants used in traditional Native American medicine
Plants described in 1753
Taxa named by Carl Linnaeus